"The New Mother" is a short story written by Lucy Clifford and first published in her collection of children's stories, The Anyhow Stories, Moral and Otherwise in 1882. The story has been reprinted in anthologies, including The Dark Descent, and was rewritten for the Scary Stories to Tell in the Dark series.

Summary
The story concerns two well-behaved sisters, Blue-Eyes and Turkey, living with their mother and their baby brother, Arthur, in the forest while their father is far away at sea. One day, the sisters meet a strange girl, who tells them that she has a tiny man and woman in a compartment on her peardrum (a musical instrument described as "like a guitar in shape; it had three strings, but only two pegs by which to tune them. The third string was never tuned at all, and thus added to the singular effect produced by the village girl’s music"), and will only show them to naughty children. The children return home, and do their best to be naughty despite their love for their mother. The mother, despondent, tells the girls that if they don't behave she will have to go away with their infant sibling, and be replaced by a "new mother" with "glass eyes and a wooden tail". When the children next meet the girl, she tells them they haven't been nearly naughty enough, and suggests ways for them to be more naughty. This cycle repeats three times, at the end of which the mother takes the infant child and leaves. Shortly afterward, the strange girl marches past the sisters' house, taunting them that they will never be naughty enough to see the little people and the sisters' mother has left to be with their father at sea and will never return. The sisters do not believe the girl and clean up the house and await their mother's return.  The new mother shows up but the sisters try not to let her in. Turkey spies through the front window and see that the new mother does indeed have glass eyes and a wooden tail. The new mother threatens to break down the door with her wooden tail, and the sisters flee into the woods where they live on what they can forage. They occasionally revist the house in search of their real mother, but the house is now under the ownership of the new mother.

Adaptations and legacy
The story was rewritten by Alvin Schwartz as "The Drum" for More Scary Stories to Tell in the Dark in 1984, the second installment of Scary Stories to Tell in the Dark. In Schwartz's version, the sisters (renamed Delores and Sandra) attempt to obtain a drum that contains a dancing mechanical man and woman from a gypsy girl. And at the end, when the mother and baby leave, the sisters go in search of them. But they do not find them and head back home. Only to find the new mother waiting for them inside their hut. Schwartz misattributed the original story as an anonymous folktale entitled "The Pear Drum".

In his 1997 collection More Short & Shivery, Robert D. San Souci rewrote the tale, retaining the basic plot structure but revising the ending. The girl and her guitar are changed to an old beggar woman at the market with a music box, where the figures of a boy and a girl come out and dance. The two sisters (Blue-Eyes and the renamed Red-Skirts) misbehave to come into possession of the box, only for the new mother with the glass eyes and wooden tail to be revealed as the beggar woman, who was in disguise. The children are swallowed by the woman's handbag that grows to a large size when she arrives at their house. The story ends sometime later with two brothers approaching the woman in the market, who opens the box to reveal the dancing figures of two girls, one with blue eyes and one with red skirts.

"The New Mother" was adapted into the 2008 short film "Music Box", where the sisters are lured into misbehaving by a homeless woman to claim her music box. Unlike the original story, the eponymous new mother is not featured and the sisters' mother simply leaves them at the end. The short film was written and directed by Brian Lange and starred Abi McKenzie and Shelby Howe as the sisters, Dana DeLorenzo as the homeless woman, and Danielle Brothers as the girls' mother.

Neil Gaiman has acknowledged "The New Mother" as one of two major influences on his 2002 novella Coraline.

See also
 "The Father-thing"
 Coraline

References

External links
 "The New Mother" at WeirdFictionReview.com.

1882 short stories
Fantasy short stories
Horror short stories